Iran (is not the problem) or Iran is not the problem (2008) Iranian documentary film directed, produced and written by Aaron Newman.

Plot
The 79-minute feature documentary argues that the American media does not reliably report on Iran's differences with the US. It also presents a view countering the international perspective that Iran's nuclear proliferation is aimed at destroying Israel, contrary to fact of the US domination of the world and its diplomatic  double speak. It also appraises the democratic movement within Iran, attributes reasons for the conflicts with the US and Israel, and offers some solutions. Many opinions are screened which express their individual views.

Cast 
 Antonia Juhasz 		
 Larry Everest 		
 Robert Gould 		
 Michael Veiluva 		
 Mitchell Plitnick 		
 Jim Haber 		
 Majid Baradar 		
 David Glick 		
 Shahab 		
 Sahar Driver

Production 
Aaron Newman directed, produced and wrote the screenplay of the film. He also was the editor of the film. The music of the film was composed by Anomaly Arts. Jim Serchak was the cinematographer of the film. Maria Byerley was the illustrator with sound recording by Michael Schrecker 	and animation done by Jake Mathew.

Newman is an activist who speaks for anti-imperialism and pro-democracy, and is the foundermember of the SF Chomsky Book Club, and a member of Hands Off Iran club. The documentary is produced with the aim of creating a purposeful discussion on Iran. There is also a 20-minute DVD version meant to be presented in meetings.

References

External links 
 
 

Documentary films about Iran
2008 films
2008 documentary films
American documentary films
2000s English-language films
2000s American films